Seyt-Daut Magomedsaliyevich Garakoyev (born 26 August 1992) is a Russian football midfielder.

Club career
He made his debut in the Russian Second Division for FC Olimpia Volgograd on 15 April 2013 in a game against FC Volgar-Astrakhan Astrakhan.

He made his Russian Football National League debut for FC Angusht Nazran on 7 July 2013 in a game against FC Neftekhimik Nizhnekamsk.

Personal life
He is the older brother of Bilan Garakoyev, who is also a footballer.

References

External links
 
 

1992 births
Living people
People from Nazran
Russian footballers
Russia youth international footballers
FC Olimpia Volgograd players
FC Ufa players
Association football midfielders
FC Angusht Nazran players
FC Luch Vladivostok players
FC Fakel Voronezh players
FC Volgar Astrakhan players
FC Lokomotiv Moscow players
FC Anzhi Makhachkala players
FC Shukura Kobuleti players
Russian expatriate footballers
Expatriate footballers in Georgia (country)
FC Veles Moscow players